Walter Murphy (born 1952) is an American composer and pianist.

Walter Murphy may also refer to:
Walter Murphy (baseball) (1907–1976) Major League Baseball pitcher
Walter F. Murphy (1929–2010), American political scientist and writer
Walter L. Murphy (born 1937), American football coach and judge
Pete Murphy (Walter Murphy, 1872–1946), American football player and state legislator